Redonda Bay is an uninhabited  locality that was the site of a cannery owned by Francis Millerd & Co., located on the northwest side of West Redonda Island in the Discovery Islands of the South Coast of British Columbia, Canada.

See also
List of canneries in British Columbia

References

Unincorporated settlements in British Columbia
Discovery Islands
Populated places in the Strathcona Regional District